Most Democratic voters supported Hillary Clinton, but some traditionally Democratic counties in the Rust Belt voted for Donald Trump. One reason given for Trump winning counties in Appalachian Ohio in the 2016 Ohio Republican primary was Democratic voters opposed to free trade who had voted in the Republican primary. In general CNN exit polls showed Ohio Democratic voters with slightly less support for Clinton than the national average, and Trump receiving higher support among Democratic voters in Ohio than Romney had in 2012.

Hillary Clinton had relatively low support in Appalachia from Democratic voters. In interviews with The Guardian, Appalachian Democrats voting for Trump cited concerns about NAFTA and coal-mining. An exit poll showed Donald Trump receiving 22% of the Democratic vote in Kentucky, a state Clinton had won overwhelmingly in the 2008 presidential primary. Elliott County, Kentucky, which had the longest unbroken streak of voting Democrat of any county in the United States, went for Trump. Some Appalachian states, such as Tennessee and West Virginia, did not have exit polls.

Overall CNN exit polls indicated Clinton received 89% of the Democratic vote, compared with House Democrats receiving 92% of the Democratic vote. The difference between percentage of Republicans voting for a Republican representative and voting for Trump was six points. The Democrats who voted for Trump have been labelled "Trumpocrats".

There were also Democratic voters who favored Jill Stein. In Oregon, Stein received one percent of the Democratic vote according to CNN exit polls, equal to the total for all third-party voting among Democrats in 2012.

Prominent Democrats who supported other candidates
This list also includes people who left the Democratic Party in 2016.

Democrats for Trump 
 Robert Kraft, Owner of the New England Patriots
 David Clarke, Sheriff of Milwaukee County. While Clarke is elected as a Democrat, he has refused membership in, and has been very critical of the Democratic Party of Wisconsin.
 Michael T. Flynn, retired 3-star General, former Director of the Defense Intelligence Agency
 Tom Luken, former mayor of Cincinnati and former United States Representative
 Richard Ojeda, a member of the West Virginia Senate from the 7th district. Ojeda says he voted for Trump, but Ojeda did not actively campaign for him.
 David Saunders, political strategist and author
 Andrew Stein, former Borough President of Manhattan and President of the New York City Council
 Adam Walinsky, lawyer who served in the Department of Justice and as a speechwriter for Robert F. Kennedy
 R. James Woolsey Jr., former Director of Central Intelligence

Democrats for Stein 
 Cecil Bothwell, member of the Asheville, North Carolina city council (switched to Independent)
 Jimmy Dore, comedian and political commentator (switched to Independent)
 Coleen Rowley, former FBI agent and congressional candidate
 Susan Sarandon, actress

Others 
 Jim Justice, Democratic nominee for governor of West Virginia. Justice joined the Republican Party in 2017.
 Rocky De La Fuente, businessman and 2016 presidential candidate. De La Fuente joined the Republican Party in 2017.
 Caitlin Flanagan, writer and social critic
 Douglas Schoen, conservative analyst and Democratic political operative. Schoen has a long record of criticizing the Democratic Party while a Fox News contributor.
 Douglas Wilder, former Governor of Virginia

See also 
Party switching in the United States
Democrats for Nixon
Reagan Democrat
Democratic and liberal support for John McCain in 2008
List of Republicans who opposed the Donald Trump 2016 presidential campaign
Obama–Trump voters
Sanders–Trump voters

Notes

References

Democrats opposing